William Hector Rankin III (born 23 March 1951) is an English rock drummer, active in the 1960s and 1970s.

He joined Kippington Lodge in 1968 and remained with them when they evolved into Brinsley Schwarz in 1969. He played on all Brinsley Schwarz's albums, and whilst with them, also drummed on albums for Ernie Graham, Chilli Willi and the Red Hot Peppers, Colin Scot and Frankie Miller.

After Brinsley Schwarz broke up in 1974, Rankin briefly joined Ducks Deluxe for their final tours, and played on their final album Last Night of a Pub Rock Band, recorded at London's 100 Club on 1 July 1975.  He briefly joined Terraplane but did not record with them, and also appeared on two albums for Dave Edmunds. He joined Big Jim Sullivan's Tiger with whom he recorded two albums, before retiring from the music industry

In October 2007 Tyla, Belmont, Groome and Rankin reformed Ducks Deluxe, to celebrate the 35th anniversary of their formation, and performed at the 100 Club, the venue of their final performance in 1975.

Discography
With Brinsley Schwarz
Brinsley Schwarz
Despite It All
Nervous on the Road
Silver Pistol
Please Don't Ever Change
Original Golden Greats
Unknown Numbers (bootleg)
What IS So Funny About Peace Love & Understanding?
Cruel to Be Kind
The New Favourites of... Brinsley Schwarz

With Chilli Willi and the Red Hot Peppers
Kings of the Robot Rhythm

With Colin Scot
Colin Scot

With Dave Edmunds
Subtle as a Flying Mallet
Get It

With Ducks Deluxe
Last Night of a Pub Rock Band

With Ernie Graham
Ernie Graham

With Frankie Miller
Once in a Blue Moon

With Nick Lowe
Jesus of Cool (Bonus tracks only)
Quiet Please... The New Best of Nick Lowe	

With Big Jim Sullivan's Tiger
Tiger
Going Down Laughing

References

1951 births
Living people
English rock drummers
British male drummers
Brinsley Schwarz members
Ducks Deluxe members